Deborah Compagnoni (born 4 June 1970) is an Italian former Alpine skier who won three gold medals at the 1992, 1994, and 1998 Winter Olympics.

Biography

Deborah Compagnoni was born in Bormio, northern Lombardy, and skied with the G.S. Forestale club.

Compagnoni soon attracted attention for her great talent. Her career was always marked by major successes, but also by serious accidents. After her first major victory, the World Junior title in Giant slalom, and her first podium in World Cup, she broke her right knee in the Val d'Isére downhill. After surgery, she decided to stop competing in downhill races, where her talent could have permitted even greater successes than those she obtained in her still outstanding career.

Compagnoni won her first race in the World Cup in 1992. She also won the gold medal at the Winter Olympics of the same year, again in the Super-G: However, while racing the Giant Slalom, one day later, she destroyed her left knee.

In the following years, she left the speed disciplines (downhill and Super-G), confirming herself as one of the best Giant Slalom specialists. Her fragile knees hindered Compagnoni's practice activity, and limited the number of victories in the World Cup; however, she always arrived in her best shape for the major championships. In 1994, at the Lillehammer Olympics, she won the gold medal in the Giant Slalom, a feat she repeated four years later in Nagano. In 1998, she won also a silver medal in the Slalom, finishing second by only 0.06 seconds.

Compagnoni won the World Championship in Giant Slalom in 1996; in the following year's edition, she repeated the victory, alongside winning with the Slalom title, a feat never accomplished by any other Italian female skier. She won a total of 16 races in the Alpine Skiing World Cup (13 Giant Slalom, 2 Super-G, and 1 Slalom), plus a Giant Slalom World Cup in 1997.

Deborah Compagnoni is considered the best Italian female skier of all time, the equal of famous male champions like Gustav Thöni and Alberto Tomba. The World Cup skiing track in her native Santa Caterina Valfurva has been named after her.

She is married to Alessandro Benetton, and they have three children: Agnese, Tobias, and Luce; they live in Ponzano Veneto, Italy. Her brother Jacopo Compagnoni, a fellow Alpine skier, died during an avalanche on Monte Sobretta on December 16, 2021, at the age of 40.

World Cup results

Season titles

Season standings

Races victories
These are her world cup victories.

See also
 List of multiple Winter Olympic medalists
 Italian sportswomen multiple medalists at Olympics and World Championships
 Italian skiers who closed in top 10 in overall World Cup
 List of FIS Alpine Ski World Cup women's race winners

References

External links
 
 

1970 births
Living people
Sportspeople from the Province of Sondrio
Italian female alpine skiers
Alpine skiers at the 1992 Winter Olympics
Alpine skiers at the 1994 Winter Olympics
Alpine skiers at the 1998 Winter Olympics
Olympic medalists in alpine skiing
FIS Alpine Ski World Cup champions
Benetton people
Medalists at the 1998 Winter Olympics
Medalists at the 1994 Winter Olympics
Medalists at the 1992 Winter Olympics
Olympic gold medalists for Italy
Olympic silver medalists for Italy
Olympic alpine skiers of Italy